The name Emilia has been used for eight tropical cyclones in the Eastern Pacific Ocean.

 Tropical Storm Emilia (1978) – never affected land.
 Tropical Storm Emilia (1982) – never affected land.
 Tropical Storm Emilia (1988) – never affected land.
 Hurricane Emilia (1994) – Category 5 hurricane, threatened Hawaii but turned away without affecting land.
 Tropical Storm Emilia (2000) – never affected land.
 Tropical Storm Emilia (2006) – came near Baja California but turned away.
 Hurricane Emilia (2012) – strongest storm of the season, churned in the open ocean.
 Tropical Storm Emilia (2018) – never affected land.

Pacific hurricane set index articles